Torben Theine (born 10 July 1968) is a former professional tennis player from Germany.

Career
Theine lost his only Grand Slam singles match, at the 1988 Australian Open, to American Paul Chamberlin. He also competed in the men's doubles, with Steve Shaw, but was unable to make it past the opening round. His two other Grand Slam appearances were both in the men's doubles, with Heiner Moraing at the 1989 Australian Open and Gavin Pfitzner at the 1990 Wimbledon Championships.

Challenger titles

Doubles: (2)

References

1968 births
Living people
German male tennis players
West German male tennis players
People from Bad Oeynhausen
Sportspeople from Detmold (region)
Tennis people from North Rhine-Westphalia